DeWine is the surname of three United States politicians from Ohio:

 Mike DeWine, current governor of Ohio
 Pat DeWine, associate justice of the Ohio Supreme Court
 Kevin DeWine, former member of the Ohio House of Representatives

See also